Dideriksen is a surname. Notable people with the surname include:

 Amalie Dideriksen (born 1996), Danish cyclist
 Bent Dideriksen (born 1931), Danish footballer
 Katrina Rose Dideriksen (born 1983), American stage actress

See also
 Didriksen